Antonio Rinaldo (1816 – 27 September 1875) was an Italian-Swiss painter. Born in Tremona, Switzerland, he painted mainly of genre, but also of religious subjects.

Biography
He was a resident and active in the Veneto, in the Canton of Ticino, and neighboring Lombardy. At Turin, in 1880, he displayed il birichino of Venice; L'Orfanelici; In inverno (genre scene). In 1881 at Milan, Pescirendola; Bottena; Fruttatelo; Lesi a pian che non te senta and the same year at Venice, Il mio tesoro; Pescivendolo; No ghe ze pià acqua; In riposo.  Visita ai Carotti; Venezia Ad un appuntamento; Prima del Bagno were exhibited at Turin. Among other works: Il mio moroso; Ritorno dal babbo; In carnevale; Al Garanghello, Banchetto popolare Veniceno). In 1887 at Venice, he exhibited: Barche peschereccie.

References

1816 births
1875 deaths
Italian genre painters
19th-century Italian painters
Italian male painters
Painters from Venice
19th-century Italian male artists